A Moment in Time is a 2013 Filipino romantic drama film directed by Emmanuel Quindo Palo and starring Coco Martin and Julia Montes. The film was shot in Amsterdam and other cities such as Paris. The film was produced by Dreamscape Cinema and Star Cinema and released February 13, 2013.

This marks Coco Martin and Julia Montes' first film together after their TV series Walang Hanggan.

Plot 
Patrick (Coco Martin) is a part-time waiter and self-employed artist. He meets Jillian (Julia Montes) on a subway and the two fall in love. Patrick later discovers Jillian's past and has a hard time accepting her truth. He starts to make her suffer by pretending that he really loves her. What will happen when Jillian moves? And what will happen when Patrick comes back to apologize?

Cast 
Julia Montes as Jillian Linden
Coco Martin as Patrick Javier
Cherie Gil as Karen Linden
Gabby Concepcion as Steve Linden
Zsa Zsa Padilla as Miriam Javier
Ella Cruz as Mai-mai Javier
Joseph Marco as Morie
Manuel Chua as Bodjie
Joj Agpangan as Chummy
Jai Agpangan as Yummy
Ivan Dorschner as Brix
Erin Ocampo as Bianca
PJ Endrinal as Christian
Malou Crisologo as Mayordoma
Jong Cuenco as Orchestra Conductor

Production

Location 
The film was shot while their TV series Walang Hanggan is still airing. It was shot in Amsterdam and other cities like Paris. Some scenes were taken in Manila.

Music 
Erik Santos recorded a cover of "You Are My Song" originally sung by Martin Nievera and Regine Velasquez-Alcasid,  was used as the film's theme song.

Reception

Rating 
The film was graded "B" by the Cinema Evaluation Board and received a "GP" rating from the MTRCB.

Box office 
The film was a box office success, grossing  in its four weeks run in the theaters.

Television premiere 
The film had its television premiere on December 15, 2013 in the cable channel Cinema One.

Accolades

References

External links 

2013 romantic drama films
2013 films
2010s English-language films
2010s Dutch-language films
Films shot in France
Films shot in Amsterdam
Star Cinema films
2010s Tagalog-language films
Philippine romantic drama films
2013 multilingual films
Philippine multilingual films
Films directed by Emmanuel Quindo Palo